Charles James Stuart-Wortley (3 June 1802 – 22 May 1844) was a British politician, the second son of James Stuart-Wortley-Mackenzie, 1st Baron Wharncliffe.

He was an observer at the French siege of Antwerp in 1832, and wrote an account of the affair.

On 17 February 1831 he married Lady Emmeline Manners (d. 1855), daughter of John Manners, 5th Duke of Rutland, by whom he had three children:
Archibald Henry Plantagenet Stuart-Wortley (26 July 1832 – 30 April 1890), married on 15 June 1879 Lavinia Rebecca Gibbins (d. 1937)
Adelbert William John Stuart-Wortley (d. 1847)
Victoria Alexandrina Stuart-Wortley (d. 29 March 1912), married on 4 July 1863 Sir William Earle Welby-Gregory, 4th Baronet

He died in 1844 of the effects of a hunting accident suffered earlier in life.

References

1802 births
1844 deaths
Members of the Parliament of the United Kingdom for constituencies in Cornwall
UK MPs 1830–1831
UK MPs 1831–1832
Younger sons of barons
Charles
Hunting accident deaths
Accidental deaths in the United Kingdom